Echinodorus subalatus is a species of aquatic plants in the Alismataceae. It is native to Cuba, Mexico, Central America, Guyana, Venezuela, Bolivia, Brazil and Paraguay. It is found naturally growing in mud by the side of streams.

Description
Leaves with canaliculate petioles, blades lanceolate, narrowly to broadly ovate, sharp on the tip, decumbent or rarely abrupt on the base, 18 – 24 cm long x 2 – 9 cm wide, with terrestrial forms usually only 10 x 2 cm having 5 - 7 veins and distinct pellucid lines.

Stem below cylindrical, between whorls triangular in cross-section, often alate, 35 – 120 cm long. Inflorescence racemose or paniculate having 4 - 15 whorls. Bracts on base connate, longer than the pedicels (up to 3.5 cm). Pedicels 0.5 – 2 cm long. Sepals 4 – 6 mm long, petals about twice as long, the diameter of the corolla 1.2 - 1.5 cm. Usually 12 stamens, achenes 2 x 1.5 mm with one, rarely 2 glands separated by a rib. Stylar beak bent back - reaching usually 1/4 of the body.

Vegetatively, resembles E. andrieuxii, nut differs by having distinct pellucid lines, a usually paniculate inflorescence and by achenes with beaks that are at most 1/3 as long as the body.

Cultivation
Deep, rich growing substrate and a good light. Will grow submersed or emersed. Benefits from additional CO2.

References

External links 
 FishIndex
 Echinodorus (German text)
  E. subalatus : text in Spanish but very useful photographs

subalatus
Flora of Central America
Flora of Brazil
Flora of Mexico
Flora of Cuba
Flora of Guyana
Flora of Venezuela
Flora of Bolivia
Flora of Paraguay
Plants described in 1830
Freshwater plants
Flora without expected TNC conservation status